Princes et Princesses (Princes and Princesses) is a 2000 compilation film by French animator Michel Ocelot.

The film consists of six episodes of the 1989 French silhouette animation television series Ciné si.

Release
Produced in 1999 by Les Armateurs and released to French cinemas on 26 January 2000, Princes et princesses became Ocelot's second feature film (following 1998's Kirikou and the Sorceress). The feature version comprises slightly edited versions of 6 of the 8 12-minute episodes, with the addition of a 1-minute intermission at the half-way point. In Japan, it was distributed on DVD-Video with the co-operation of Studio Ghibli, initially in the Ghibli Cinema Library and re-released under the Ghibli Museum Library label. The film won both the adult and children's jury awards at the Chicago International Children's Film Festival.

Home media
As of November 2010, there are no known plans to release Princes et princesses in the United Kingdom or Australia. It has seen home video releases in the United States and earlier in Canada, however, where it is only available as the second disc of a Kirikou and the Sorceress two-DVD set. Both discs have English subtitles, though only for the main feature on each. Also, there is no DVD which uses the full, original, 1.5:1 aspect ratio; they are optimised for either 4:3 or 16:9 screens and playing the pillarboxed widescreen version on a 4:3 television will result in windowboxing.

References

External links
 
 Princes et princesses at La Fabrique
 
 Princes et princesses at Le Palais des dessins animés
 
 Princes et princesses review at Movierapture.com

2000 animated films
2000s French animated films
2000s French-language films
2000 films
Films directed by Michel Ocelot
French animated feature films
Silhouettes
Japan in non-Japanese culture
2000s French films